Bougainville's skink (Lerista bougainvillii) is a species of skink, a lizard in the family Scincidae. This species is also commonly called the south-eastern slider and Bougainville's lerista.

Etymology
The specific name, bougainvillii, and the common names, Bougainville's skink and Bougainville's lerista, are in honour of French naval officer Hyacinthe de Bougainville.

Geographic range
L. bougainvillii is found in south-eastern Australia, including north-eastern Tasmania and many Bass Strait islands.

Description
Bougainville's skink has very reduced limbs and moves in a snake-like manner.

Habitat
The preferred natural habitats of L. bougainvillii are forest and shrubland. However, it is seldom seen, as much of its life is spent beneath leaf-litter, loose sand, and thin stone slabs.

Reproduction
The mode of reproduction of L. bougainvillii varies. Some populations are oviparous, but other populations are viviparous.

References

Further reading
Cogger HG (2014). Reptiles and Amphibians of Australia, Seventh Edition. Clayton, Victoria, Australia: CSIRO Publishing. xxx + 1,033 pp. .
Gray JE (1839). "Catalogue of the Slender-tongued Saurians, with Descriptions of many New Genera and Species". Annals and Magazine of Natural History, First Series 2: 331-337. ("Riopa Brougainvillii [sic]", new species, p. 332).
Greer AE (1967). "A new generic arrangement for some Australian scincid lizards". Breviora (267): 1-19. (Lerista bougainvillii, new combination).
Wilson S, Swan G (2013). A Complete Guide to Reptiles of Australia, Fourth Edition. Sydney: New Holland Publishers. 522 pp. .

Skinks of Australia
Reptiles described in 1839
Lerista
Taxa named by John Edward Gray